During the 1993–94 season, the English football club Portsmouth F.C. were placed 17th out of 24 in the Football League First Division, winning 15 matches, drawing 13 and losing 18. The team reached the quarterfinals of the League Cup and the third round of the FA Cup, in both cases being knocked out after replays.

First Division

FA Cup

League Cup

Anglo-Italian Cup 

Portsmouth F.C. seasons
Portsmouth